Sebastián Fleitas Miranda (22 February 1947 – 14 April 2000) was a footballer from Paraguay who played as a striker.

Club career
Born in Asunción, Fleitas started his career at Club Libertad of Paraguay, making his debut at the age of 17 and quickly earning the nickname babygol. In 1967, he was the top scorer of the Paraguayan League, coming to the attention of Spanish side CD Málaga, who eventually signed Fleitas in 1968. A good first season at Málaga was enough to attract the interest of Real Madrid, who signed him in 1969. At Real Madrid, Fleitas won the Copa del Rey in the 1969–70 season and one Spanish League title in 1971–72. He was the scorer of Real's only goal in the 1971 European Cup Winners' Cup Final replay game in Piraeus, Greece, won 2–1 by Chelsea.

After retiring in 1976, Fleitas worked in football in various capacities, ending up as a scout for Real Madrid.

International career
Fleitas played three times for the Paraguay national team, all of them in friendlies scoring once.

Personal life
Fleitas was married to the daughter of Spanish actor Fernando Rey and living in Madrid, where he died prematurely, at age 53, while alone in his apartment, from what appeared to be a stroke. Real's former manager Vicente del Bosque characterized Fleitas as "a man beloved by everyone who lived around the club".

Honours
Real Madrid
 La Liga: 1971–72
 Copa del Rey: 1969–70Individual'''
Paraguayan League top scorer in 1967

References

External links
Sebastián Fleitas in the official La Liga website

1947 births
2000 deaths
Paraguayan footballers
Paraguay international footballers
La Liga players
Club Libertad footballers
Expatriate footballers in Spain
CD Málaga footballers
Real Madrid CF players
Nîmes Olympique players
Ligue 1 players
Expatriate footballers in France
Sevilla FC players
CA Marbella footballers
Association football forwards